Munkhbileg Enebish (born 3 October 1988) is  first Mongolian International Umpire in Table Tennis. Munkhbileg officiated in number of international events including Singapore 2010 Youth Olympic Games as well as Nanjing 2014 Youth Olympic Games. He attended National University of Mongolia for BS degree and LUISS Business School of Italy for MBA International Business.

Personal life 

Munkhbileg Enebish was raised in Ulaanbaatar, Mongolia, but pursued USA to attend Albany High School in California. After completing high school, he returned to his home country continue his study in School of Physics and Electronics of National University of Mongolia. Munkhbileg started his work career in Institute of Physics and Technology of Mongolian Academy of Science right after his graduation. After working for one year, Munkhbileg decided to begin his own business and moved to Abu Dhabi, UAE, where he lived with his family for 2 years.

Munkhbileg Enebish received scholarship to study in LUISS Business School of Italy, and after completing two-year study in Rome, he received MBA International Business degree.

Table Tennis

Fencing

References 

1988 births
Living people